Patricia Janet Scotland, Baroness Scotland of Asthal,  (born 19 August 1955), is a British diplomat, barrister and politician, serving as the sixth secretary-general of the Commonwealth of Nations. She was elected at the 2015 Commonwealth Heads of Government Meeting and took office on 1 April 2016. She is the first woman to hold the post. She was elevated to the House of Lords in 1997 and, as a British Labour Party politician, served in ministerial positions within the UK Government, most notably as the  Attorney General for England and Wales and Advocate General for Northern Ireland. She is a dual citizen of the United Kingdom and Dominica, where she was born.

Early life and career
Scotland was born on 19 August 1955 in Dominica, the 10th child of 12 born to Roman Catholic parents, a Dominican mother and Antiguan father. Her family emigrated to Walthamstow in north-east London when she was two years old, where she attended Chapel End Primary School and Walthamstow School for Girls. She then went on to Mid Essex Technical College in Chelmsford, where she obtained a Bachelor of Laws degree from University of London as an external student. She was called to the bar at the Middle Temple in 1977, specialising in family law, and was called to the Dominican bar in 1978.

In 1991, Scotland became the first black woman to be appointed a Queen's Counsel. She later founded the (now closed) 1 Gray's Inn Square barristers chambers. Early in 1997, she was elected as a Bencher of the Middle Temple. Scotland was named as a Millennium Commissioner on 17 February 1994, and was a member of the Commission for Racial Equality. She received a life peerage on a Labour Party list of working peers and was created Baroness Scotland of Asthal, of Asthal in the County of Oxfordshire on 30 October 1997.

Politics
From 1999 to 2001, Scotland was the Parliamentary Under-Secretary of State at the Foreign and Commonwealth Office, where she was responsible, among others, for the UK Government's diplomatic relations with North America, the Caribbean, Overseas Territories, Consular Division, British Council, administration and all Parliamentary business in the House of Lords.  Scotland introduced the International Criminal Court Bill which sought to ratify the jurisdiction of the International Criminal Court into UK law. She established the Pro Bono Lawyers Panel, a panel of British-based lawyers who provided legal advice on a pro bono basis to United Kingdom nationals imprisoned in foreign countries. She created an Overseas Territories Council for the Caribbean and reformed and restructured the Foreign and Commonwealth Office's Consular Division to be able to respond more effectively to emergencies and disasters abroad such as the 11 September attacks.

In 2001 she became Parliamentary Secretary, Lord Chancellor's Department, and was made a member of the Privy Council of the United Kingdom. She was the minister formally responsible for civil justice and the reform of civil law including the comprehensive reform of land registration leading to the Land Registration Act 2002. She was also formally responsible for international affairs at the Lord Chancellor's Department and was appointed by Prime Minister Tony Blair as the UK Alternate Representative to the European Convention and was given primary responsibility for the negotiations in relation to the Charter of Rights which were successfully concluded in 2003. During this period she consolidated the strong relations created with all the applicant countries through the FAHR programme and the member states and was subsequently awarded the Polish Medal for her contribution to the reform and development of Law in Poland.

Scotland was an unsuccessful contender for a cabinet position in 2003, when Blair reportedly considered appointing her Leader of the House of Lords.

In 2003, Scotland was made Minister of State for the Criminal Justice System and Law Reform at the Home Office and deputy to the Home Secretary. She served in that post until 2007 under three Home Secretaries: David Blunkett, Charles Clarke and John Reid. While at the Home Office she was responsible for major reform of the criminal justice system. She created the Office of Criminal Justice Reform which helped to create and support the National Criminal Justice Board and the Local Criminal Justice Board. Having acted as chair, she then created three Alliances to reduce re-offending (Corporate, Civic and Faith based Alliance) and the Corporate Alliance against Domestic Violence. She created an advisory group on victims and the Criminal Justice Centre, Victims and Witness units.

Scotland created Inside Justice Week and the Justice Awards. She introduced the Crime and Victims Act, which created the new offence of familial homicide that was successfully used to prosecute the killers of Baby P who would otherwise have escaped responsibility for his death.

Scotland continued her responsibility for international affairs at the Home Office and continued to represent the UK in a number of international negotiations such as those relating to extradition.

NatWest Three
A new extradition treaty with the United States had been signed on 31 March 2003. Scotland had the responsibility for promoting the necessary legislation in the House of Lords. The "NatWest Three" extradition case made use of this treaty. The three men were British citizens, living in the UK and working for a British bank. On 12 July 2006, in a highly unusual move, the Speaker of the House of Commons, Michael Martin, allowed an emergency debate on both the treaty and the NatWest Three after a request by Liberal Democrat frontbencher Nick Clegg.

During the debate, Scotland's view in 2005 that a higher threshold to establish probable cause was required by the UK to extradite from the US than vice versa was contrasted by Clegg to comments which the Prime Minister had made in July 2006, in which he stated that the evidential burdens on the two countries were the same. The NatWest Three were subsequently extradited, and accepted a plea-bargain under which they pleaded guilty to a single count of wire fraud in the United States and were sentenced to 37 months' imprisonment.

Attorney General

On 28 June 2007, Scotland was appointed Attorney General by Prime Minister Gordon Brown. She was the first woman to hold the office since its foundation in 1315.

During her time as Attorney General, Scotland continued to promote pro bono work by lawyers and created an international and Schools Pro Bono Committee which was responsible for co-ordinating pro bono work. She created the Pro Bono Awards and Pro Bono Heroes. She also created the Attorney General's Youth Network.

She was the last Attorney General for England and Wales also to be the Attorney General for Northern Ireland before the devolution of justice powers to the Northern Ireland Assembly, and appointment of a separate Attorney General for Northern Ireland. She became instead Advocate General for Northern Ireland, the UK government's chief advisor on Northern Ireland law, for a brief period until Labour left office.

Shadow Attorney General
When Labour left government on 11 May 2010, Scotland became the Shadow Attorney General and was reappointed to that role by Ed Miliband when he appointed his first Shadow Cabinet in October 2010.

In November 2012, she was appointed Prime Ministerial Trade Envoy to South Africa.

Local government
In December 2014, Scotland was elected as the Alderman for the ward of Bishopsgate in the City of London, having stood (in accordance with convention in the City) as an independent candidate.

Commonwealth Secretary-General

At the 2015 Commonwealth Heads of Government Meeting, Scotland was nominated for the position of Commonwealth Secretary-General by her native country of Dominica and defeated Antiguan diplomat Ronald Sanders, who was thought to have been the frontrunner for the position, and former deputy secretary-general for political affairs Mmasekgoa Masire-Mwamba of Botswana to become the 6th Commonwealth Secretary-General and the first woman to hold the post. She began her first of a maximum of two possible four-year terms on 1 April 2016.

Her candidacy was opposed by Hugh Segal, former Canadian special envoy to the Commonwealth and senator, who wrote in an editorial that she was not qualified for the position because she "accepted a well-paying brief from a junta in the Maldives to argue against the Commonwealth’s legitimacy when it and Canada sought the restoration of democracy in that country."

Her bid to have her four-year term automatically renewed was rejected in June 2020, in contrast to the usual convention where an incumbent seeking a second term in office is elected unopposed for his or her second term. This followed a "significant and diverse number of colleagues from across the Commonwealth" raising objection to the proposal, due to allegations of cronyism following an audit of the Commonwealth Secretariat's procurement practices. Her first term was extended, 
however, due to the postponement of the  2020 Commonwealth Heads of Government Meeting.

Lady Scotland was re-elected to a second term at the 2022 Commonwealth Heads of Government Meeting, reportedly defeating Jamaican foreign minister Kamina Johnson Smith by 27 votes to 24. As her first term had been extended by two years due to the pandemic and the postponement of the 2020 CHOGM, Scotland promised that she will only serve for two more years instead of a full four-year term.

In her capacity as Secretary General, Baroness Scotland read a scripture reading at the funeral of Queen Elizabeth II in Westminster Abbey on 19 September 2022.

Controversies

Illegal immigrant employment penalty
In January 2009 Scotland employed Lolo Tapui, an illegal immigrant as a cleaner. Tapui had been using a forged passport for the period up to and including December 2008.  Tapui was later jailed for eight months for fraud, possessing a false identity stamp, and overstaying her UK visa. At her trial Tapui admitted to having been paid £95,000 by the Daily Mail. She was later deported to her native Tonga.

Scotland, who was Attorney General at the time, had earlier been subjected to a penalty of £5,000 for employing Tapui. She had not kept copies of relevant documents to check Tapui's immigration status and could therefore not establish a statutory defence. The rules were established when Scotland was a Home Office minister. The investigation by the UK Border Agency found that Scotland did not "knowingly" employ an illegal worker.

Expenses controversy
In November 2016 political blogger Guido Fawkes published purported extracts from leaked documents exposing Scotland's extravagant spending on redecorating her grace and favour apartment in Mayfair, London. Scotland denied the claims in a statement posted on the Commonwealth's website, insisting there had been "no extravagance at all" and explained that the spending was agreed by Kamalesh Sharma, the Commonwealth's secretary-general from 2008 to 2016.

Contract controversy
In January 2020, Scotland faced further criticism of her role as secretary-general of the Commonwealth for awarding a consultancy contract to a company run by a friend. The Audit Committee of the international organisation noted that she offered a contract to a fellow Labour peer, Lord Patel of Bradford, despite his firm being "apparently insolvent" and "circumventing" the normal competitive tendering process. Auditors also found that procurement rules had not been observed by the secretariat on over 50 occasions.

Charitable work
Scotland is the Patron of the Corporate Alliance Against Domestic Violence and of Chineke! Foundation. She is the joint Patron of Missio, a charity which is the Catholic Church's official support organisation for overseas mission.  She is also a patron of Children and Families Across Borders (CFAB), a charity dedicated to reuniting children who have been separated from their families.

Awards
Scotland has been voted Peer of the Year by Channel 4, The House magazine, Parliamentarian of the Year by the Spectator and the Political Studies Association, and received a number of other awards for her contribution to law reform in the UK and abroad.

Scotland was awarded an honorary degree from the University of East London in 2005. Scotland has also been ranked the most influential Black Briton in the annual "Powerlist", having been ranked first in 2010, and in 2007 & 2008 when the list had separate male/female rankings.

Scotland was decreed and invested by Prince Carlo, Duke of Castro, as a Dame of Merit with Star of the Sacred Military Constantinian Order of Saint George in 2003. In 2014 she was appointed to the Council of the British and Irish Delegation of the Constantinian Order and promoted in rank to Dame Grand Cross of Merit.

On 1 January 2014 she was appointed chancellor of the University of Greenwich.

In 2015, she was listed as one of BBC's 100 Women.

Personal life
Scotland resides in London and in Asthal, where she and her husband Richard Mawhinney, also a barrister, live with their two sons.

Scotland's son Matthew Mawhinney has appeared on the reality series Too Hot to Handle. In 2021 he was arrested and fined for abusing cabin crew on a British Airways flight, including shouting "Look up who my mum is – Baroness Scotland [...] go and get me a drink" after being refused alcohol.

Arms

Notes

References

External links

 Interview with Baroness Patricia Scotland by Julian Rogers. 7 December 2014.
 "Child of the Caribbean | Baroness Scotland | TEDxPortofSpain", YouTube, 17 December 2014.

|-

|-

|-

|-

|-

1955 births
Living people
21st-century Roman Catholics
Alumni of Anglia Ruskin University
Alumni of University of London Worldwide
Alumni of the University of London
Attorneys General for England and Wales
Attorneys General for Northern Ireland
Black British women politicians
English King's Counsel
English Roman Catholics
English women lawyers
Commonwealth Secretaries-General
Dominica emigrants to England
English people of Antigua and Barbuda descent
Labour Party (UK) life peers
Life peeresses created by Elizabeth II
20th-century English lawyers
21st-century English lawyers
Members of the Middle Temple
Members of the Privy Council of the United Kingdom
Northern Ireland Government ministers
People associated with the University of Greenwich
People educated at Walthamstow School for Girls
20th-century King's Counsel
Presidents of Chatham House
People from Walthamstow
Dominica people of Antigua and Barbuda descent
Women government ministers in the United Kingdom
Advocates General for Northern Ireland
Women Law Officers of the Crown in the United Kingdom
BBC 100 Women
20th-century women lawyers
21st-century women lawyers